Lieutenant-General Louis Hogan DSM (1921 – 21 June 2001), was Chief of Staff of the Defence Forces from June 1981 to April 1984. At the date of his appointment he was the GOC Western Command which post he held as Brigadier-General from March 1980 to June 1981. Hogan was the first officer commanding of the 27 Infantry Battalion as a Lieutenant Colonel from 1973–1976. He died on 21 June 2001 at the age of 80.

2001 deaths
1921 births
Chiefs of Staff of the Defence Forces (Ireland)
Irish Army generals
Irish military personnel